Springton is an unincorporated community and former coal town in Mercer County, West Virginia, United States. Its post office  has been closed.

References

Unincorporated communities in Mercer County, West Virginia
Unincorporated communities in West Virginia
Coal towns in West Virginia